The HTC Blue Angel (also known as "Qtek 9090" in some European markets) is a GSM Windows Mobile 2003 Second Edition PDA-phone, manufactured by High Tech Computer Corporation introduced in 2004. It has a CDMA EVDO variant called the HTC Harrier, which does not have Wi-Fi like the Blue Angel does. Both have the same housing. It is sold by many different vendors under the names of O2 XDA IIs, Orange SPV M2000, Dopod 700, Qtek 9090, T-Mobile MDA III, Siemens SX66, i-mate PDA2k, Vodafone VPx, Verizon XV6600 (Harrier), Sprint PPC-6601 (Harrier) among others, which all have similar hardware specifications.

Specifications
Dimensions: 125 x 72 x 19 (L x W x T mm)
Weight: Approx. 205 g
Operating systems: 
Windows Mobile 2003 Second Edition. Unofficial cooked roms for Windows Mobile 5, 6 and 6.1 are available, Recently, Windows Mobile 6.5 beta has been leaked for blue angel and is in developing phase at the xda-developers community.

Processor: Intel(R) XScale PXA263 400 MHz CPU (possible overclock to 600 MHz)
Memory: Flash ROM:96 MB, RAM:128 MB SDRAM
Memory expansion: SDIO/MMC card slot
Camera: VGA camera (except on the Siemens version, which lacks a camera)
Standard battery capacity: 1490mAh
Display: QVGA Transflective 65k Colour LCD, 3.5 inch, 240 x 320 pixels
Wireless connectivity: GSM/GPRS and Wi-Fi 802.11b (Blue Angel), or CDMA EVDO (Harrier); plus IrDA and Bluetooth on both models

Popularity
In 2010, a UK-based developer created an emulator image of the Android Operating System ported to the HTC Blue Angel, it lacked features and there was no integration with the user. It was an image of Android 1.6 Doughnut but the only things which were usable were the volume control buttons. This development sparked interest on xda-developers where many users were willing to help port a usable Android version to the Blue Angel.

Later in 2011, developer 'zainuintel' created an Angry Birds build for the device, showing how capable the 7 year old device was. He later created an Angry Birds RIO build, but this did not get as much popularity, Support was dropped by the developer in 2012. Starting from June 2012 it was made open source.

A well known developer named 'd-two' on XDA started developing Android builds for the Blue Angel, most people thought a working build would be impossible. However, in May 2012, d-two released a working Android build- called 'PXADroid' at first not many things worked, only baseline things were working, but later on he decided to switch to modding Cyanogen Mod 7.2, this gave him greater compatibility with the Blue Angel, now nearly everything is sufficiently working, he compiles builds which are not virtual machines, the builds he compiles are special Linux kernels, compiled for the Blue Angel, and above the kernel it runs Android. D-two made great history when he got higher capacity (SD-HC) SD cards working on the Blue Angel, he showed a 16GB card on Android, he said this is possible via a boot-loader modification. Development is still going on as the current builds are still in the ALPHA stages.

References

Blue Angel
Windows Mobile Professional devices
Mobile phones with an integrated hardware keyboard
Mobile phones introduced in 2004
Mobile phones with infrared transmitter